Ravi Subramanian (6 August 1965 – 4 June 2017) was an Indian cricket umpire. He stood in matches in Women's Twenty20 Internationals, the Ranji Trophy tournament, and other domestic List A and Twenty20 cricket matches.

References

External links
 
 

1965 births
2017 deaths
Indian cricket umpires
Cricketers from Bangalore